Marubozu (jp: まるぼうず, 丸坊主, close-cropped head, bald hill) is the name of a Japanese candlesticks formation used in technical analysis to indicate a stock has traded strongly in one direction throughout the session and closed at its high or low price of the day. A marubozu candle is represented only by a body; it has no wicks or shadows extending from the top or bottom of the candle. A white marubozu candle has a long white body and is formed when the open equals the low and the close equals the high.

The white marubozu candle indicates that buyers controlled the price of the stock from the opening bell to the close of the day, and is considered very bullish.

A black marubozu candle has a long black body and is formed when the open equals the high and the close equals the low. A black marubozu indicates that sellers controlled the price from the opening bell to the close of the day, and is considered very bearish.

See also 
 Candlestick chart
 Doji

References

Candlestick patterns